Ardeadoris averni is a species of sea slug, a dorid nudibranch, a shell-less marine gastropod mollusc in the family Chromodorididae. It was transferred to the genus Ardeadoris on the basis of DNA evidence.

Distribution 
This species was described from the Capricorn Group, Great Barrier Reef, Queensland, Australia. It is also found in the Western Pacific Ocean from Papua New Guinea and the Philippines.

Description
Ardeadoris averni is white with a bright red border to the mantle. The gills and rhinophores are white with red lines. It grows to 55 mm in length.

References

Chromodorididae
Gastropods described in 1985